Pamela Lynn Carter (born Pamela Lynn Fanning; August 20, 1949) was the first black woman to serve as a state's attorney general. She served as Indiana Attorney General from 1993 to 1997.

Career

Pamela Carter attended the University of Detroit, graduating with a bachelor's degree in social work and pre-law. She later earned an M.S.W. degree from the University of Michigan and a J.D. degree from the Indiana University School of Law.  

Carter worked as trial attorney specializing in consumer protection and joined the legal services of the United Auto Workers. Carter worked as an enforcement attorney for Indiana's secretary of state and as deputy chief of staff to Democratic Indiana Governor Evan Bayh, helping to reform health and human services in the state. Carter ran for Indiana Attorney General in 1992. Carter ran against Republican Timothy Bookwalter (a public defender from Putnam County), with Carter defeating him with fifty-two percent of the vote. Carter succeeded Linley E. Pearson to the office and served as Attorney General in the administration of Governor Bayh. Carter was succeeded to the office by Jeff Modisett.

She is the first African-American woman elected as a state's attorney general. Carter is also the first African American and the first woman attorney general in Indiana's history. In Indiana, Carter is only the second African American elected to statewide office.

In 1995, she was included on Ebony′s list of "100 Most Influential Black Americans."

See also
 List of female state attorneys general in the United States

References

1949 births
Indiana Democrats
Indiana Attorneys General
African-American women lawyers
American women lawyers
African-American lawyers
African-American people in Indiana politics
Living people
University of Michigan School of Social Work alumni
Indiana University Maurer School of Law alumni
African-American women in politics
People from South Haven, Michigan
21st-century African-American people
21st-century African-American women
20th-century African-American people
20th-century African-American women